The R399 is a Regional Route in South Africa that connects Vredenburg with the N7 between Piketberg and De Hoek.

Route
An east-west route, its western terminus is a four-way intersection with the R45 in Vredenburg. The R45 enters from the south (from Saldanha) and turns right, heading east towards Hopefield. Meanwhile, the northern road becomes the  R399. It exits Vredenburg heading northeast for 20 kilometres where it meets the R27. These two roads are co-signed heading north for two kilometres, crossing the Berg River and entering Velddrif. At a four-way intersection in Velddrif, the R399 leaves heading east. It continues for 59 kilometres until a T-junction near De Hoek. The northern route is unsigned and continues to Piketberg while the south route is signed as the R399 ending at the N7.

External links
 Routes Travel Info

References

Regional Routes in the Western Cape